The Quadrant Cycle Company was a company in Birmingham, England that was established in 1890 as a bicycle manufacturer. They advanced to make motorcycles from 1899 until their demise in 1928. They also made a tricar called Carette in 1899 and a small number of cars for about two years around 1906.

The company exhibited a car chassis with a four-speed Lloyd gearbox of the style known as "crossed rollers"; this allowed direct drive at all speeds. The used 14/16 or 20/22 hp engines made by White and Poppe.

See also
 Quadrant (motorcycles)
 List of car manufacturers of the United Kingdom

References
David Burgess Wise, The New Illustrated Encyclopedia of Automobiles.
Made in Birmingham, The Birmingham Motorcycle Industry

Defunct motor vehicle manufacturers of the United Kingdom
Defunct companies based in Birmingham, West Midlands
Manufacturing companies based in Birmingham, West Midlands